The Bastkon Awards are science fiction awards for Russian literature awarded annually by the Bastkon convention (Басткон), which began in 2001.

References

External links
 

Science fiction awards
Russian literary awards
B